I'm a Celebrity...Get Me Out of Here! returned for its seventeenth series on 19 November 2017 on ITV. The series is the third in a three-year contract, as confirmed by Ant & Dec at the end of the Coming Out show in December 2016.

In October 2017, it was confirmed that Ant & Dec would return to host the series, despite rumours suggesting that the pair would not be present due to Ant's admittance to rehab earlier in the year for drugs and alcohol addiction.

Made in Chelsea star Georgia Toffolo won the series on 10 December 2017, with Hollyoaks actor Jamie Lomas finishing runner up, and broadcaster Iain Lee finishing third. This was the first time in the show's history that women won three consecutive series. Professional boxer Amir Khan also became the highest-paid contestant in the history of the show, beating the previous £400,000 record held by Katie Price in series 9.

Three days into the series, Jack Maynard was removed from the jungle after offensive messages on Twitter were discovered.

Teaser 
The first teaser trailer was released on 1 November 2017. The trailer featured a jungle and horizon, with Ant & Dec shouting "Let's Get Ready to Jungle". A series of "countdown" trailers were released from 6 November 2017.

Celebrities 
The cast was confirmed on 13 November 2017. On 21 November, Iain Lee and Kezia Dugdale were confirmed as late entrances to the series.

{| class="wikitable sortable" style="text-align: center; white-space:nowrap; margin:auto; font-size:95.2%;"
|-
! scope="col" | Celebrity
! scope="col" | Known for
! scope="col" | Status
|-
| style="background:lavender;"|Georgia Toffolo
| style="background:lavender;"|Made in Chelsea star
| style=background:lightgreen|Winner'on 10 December 2017
|-
| Jamie Lomas 
| Hollyoaks actor
| style=background:yellow|Runner-upon 10 December 2017
|-
| Iain Lee
| Television & radio presenter
| style=background:tan|Third placeon 10 December 2017
|-
| Jennie McAlpine
| Coronation Street actress
| style=background:salmon|Eliminated 8th on 9 December 2017
|-
| Amir Khan
| Professional boxer
| style=background:salmon|Eliminated 7th on 8 December 2017
|-
| Dennis Wise
| Former England footballer
| style=background:salmon|Eliminated 6th on 7 December 2017
|-
| Stanley Johnson
| Politician & author
| style=background:salmon|Eliminated 5th on 6 December 2017
|-
| Vanessa White
| The Saturdays singer
| style=background:salmon|Eliminated 4th on 5 December 2017
|-
| Rebekah Vardy
| Model & wife of Jamie Vardy
| style=background:salmon|Eliminated 3rd on 4 December 2017
|-
| Kezia Dugdale
| Politician & former Scottish Labour leader
| style=background:salmon|Eliminated 2nd on 3 December 2017
|-
| Shappi Khorsandi
| Stand-up comedian
| style=background:salmon|Eliminated 1ston 1 December 2017
|-
| Jack Maynard
| YouTube personality
| style="background:#ccf;"| Withdrewon 21 November 2017
|-
|}

Results and elimination
 Indicates that the celebrity was immune from the vote
 Indicates that the celebrity received the most votes from the public
 Indicates that the celebrity received the fewest votes and was eliminated immediately (no bottom two)
 Indicates that the celebrity was named as being in the bottom two
 Indicates that the celebrity withdrew

Bushtucker trials
The contestants take part in daily trials to earn food. These trials aim to test both physical and mental abilities. The winner is usually determined by the number of stars collected during the trial, with each star representing a meal earned by the winning contestant for their camp mates. As with the previous three years the public voted for who took part in the trials via the I'm a Celebrity...'' app, from iOS and Android devices.
 
 The public voted for who they wanted to face the trial
 The contestants decided who would face the trial
 The trial was compulsory and neither the public nor celebrities decided who took part

Notes
 This trial was for a meal ticket rather than for stars. If the task was won then all celebrities with meal tickets were able to eat an 'actual meal'
 Becky and Stanley were excluded from the trial on medical grounds.
: Iain and Kez were competing to become Jungle Prime Minister and have the best camp.
: Iain chose Vanessa to compete against Amir in the trial.
: After winning the trial, Ant and Dec announced that Amir had won 2 care packages for camp.
 Stanley was excluded from the trial on medical grounds.
 The celebrities were split into Boys and Girls. Each team picked two members to race across the Australian Bush for the grand prize of a feast. In the live bushtucker trial, the remaining teammates were playing for a headstart in the race.
 Becky was ruled out of this task for medical reasons before she could participate. Kez, who received the third highest number of votes, took part instead.
 Becky was excluded from the trial on medical grounds.
 As they were on secret missions Amir, Dennis, Toff, and Vanessa were not eligible to be voted to do the trial.
:This trial was originally attempted by Iain, but it was decided for it to be re-attempted by Dennis.
: Jamie was playing for 8 stars with the 8th star being a drink for the campmates.

Star count

Dingo Dollar challenges
Member(s) from camp will take part in the challenge to win 'Dingo Dollars'. If they win them, then they can then take the dollars to the 'Outback Shack', where they can exchange them, for camp luxuries with Kiosk Keith. Two options are given, and the celebrities can choose which they would like to win. However, to win their luxury, a question is asked to the celebrities still in camp via the telephone box. It is often joked that Ant & Dec make up these questions and their answers. If the question is answered correctly, the celebrities can take the items back to camp. If wrong, they receive nothing and Kiosk Keith will close the shack, and the celebrities will leave empty handed.
 
 The celebrities got the question correct
 The celebrities got the question wrong

Notes
 Amir & Iain ate their Prize before getting back to the camp.
 As Iain and Stanley failed to complete the challenge, they weren't given a question to win a prize.
 The celebrities all competed to win prizes from the Shack. As 9 of them successfully completed a challenge, they chose 9 prizes.

Ratings
Official ratings are taken from Broadcasters' Audience Research Board (BARB).

References

External links
 

17
2017 British television seasons
Amir Khan (boxer)